USS Osprey has been the name of various United States Navy ships, and may refer to:

 , a minesweeper in commission from 1919 to 1920
 , a minesweeper commissioned in 1940 and sunk in 1944
 USS Osprey (AM-406), a minesweeper cancelled in 1945
 , originally USS YMS–422, a minesweeper commissioned in 1944, renamed Osprey in 1947, and transferred to the Japanese Maritime Self Defense Force in 1955
 , a coastal minehunter in commission from 1993 to 2006

See also
 , a U.S. Navy patrol boat in commission from 1917 to 1918
 , a U.S. Bureau of Fisheries fishery patrol vessel in commission from 1913 to 1921

United States Navy ship names